Ometz may refer to:

Ometz, Israel, a moshav in central Israel
Ometz (political party), a defunct Israeli political party

Hebrew words and phrases